Kadri is home to the famous Kadri Manjunath Temple.

Kadri is also famous for its annual buffalo race known as Kambala. A famous personality from Kadri is Kadri Gopalnath.
Nearby localities are Balebail and Derebail.
The Kadri-Bejai belt is also regarded as the Manhattan of Mangalore. This area already has many tall buildings, and many more are under construction. Planet SKS, a 40-storeyed highrise building, the tallest in Mangalore, and the second tallest building in Karnataka, is at Kadri. Bhandary Vertica, a 56-storeyed skyscraper, one of the tallest buildings in South India which is under construction is also located here.

Areas of Interest
 Kadri Park
 Kadri Manjunath Temple
 Kadri Jogi Mutt
 Bhadrakali Temple, Padavu Kadri
 All India Radio Studio
 Kadri Market

Educational institutions
 Karnataka Polytechnic
 Industrial Training Institute
 Padua High School & Junior college

Gallery

External links

References

Localities in Mangalore